The Gurupí River is a river in north-central Brazil which forms the boundary between Maranhão and Pará states. The Gurupí rises in the low hills which separate its basin from that of the Tocantins River to the south, and flows north into the Atlantic Ocean. The Serra do Tiracambu lies to the east, and separates the basin of the Gurupí from that of the Pindaré River.

Part of the basin lies in the  Gurupi Biological Reserve, a full protected conservation unit created in 1988.
The Gurupí basin is home to tropical moist broadleaf forest, and lies within the Tocantins–Araguaia–Maranhão moist forests ecoregion.

See also
List of rivers of Maranhão
List of rivers of Pará

References

Rivers of Maranhão
Rivers of Pará